Yemancha 1-ya is a rural locality (a selo) in Khokholskoye Urban Settlement, Khokholsky District, Voronezh Oblast, Russia. The population was 361 as of 2010. There are 9 streets.

Geography 
Yemancha 1-ya is located 17 km southeast of Khokholsky (the district's administrative centre) by road. Dmitriyevka is the nearest rural locality.

References 

Rural localities in Khokholsky District